Faust is the lead superhero character and title of a collective series of comic books by Tim Vigil (art) and playwright David Quinn (stories), released by American publishers Northstar Comics, Avatar Press, and principally by Vigil and Quinn's own Rebel Studios.

Alongside contemporaries Watchmen, The Crow, and The Dark Knight Returns, Faust was credited with popularizing the "deconstructed superheroes" genre and the notion that "comics aren't just for kids." One of the bestselling independent comics of the era, Faust issue 1 sold over 100,000 copies with later issues averaging 50,000 sales per issue, most of which sold through several printings and editions.

The series features strong graphic violence and sexual situations. The main series is known as Faust: Love Of The Damned and debuted in 1987, with new issues published irregularly, roughly once a year, or sometimes every two years. David Quinn completed a script in 1996 (when writing the proposal to sell the film). The gap between issues grew wider with time. Issue 13 was published in 2005. It then took seven years for the authors to deliver the two last issues, 14 and 15, which concluded the story 25 years after the first episode.

In 2000, Lionsgate Films released the Brian Yuzna produced feature film adaptation Faust: Love of the Damned and in July 2021, it was announced Sony Pictures Television would adapt the comic as an animated series.

Plot summary
In New York City, Beef and Hapi, two hitmen who work for a mysterious Mephistophelian crime boss known as "M", kill a drug dealer and his girlfriend. This violence is detailed in the newspaper articles of Ron Balfour, a journalist who meets Doctor Jade DeCamp in a cafe. Jade has been fired from Bellevue Hospital and is furious over the accidental death of her patient and secret lover, John Jaspers. After Jade leaves the cafe, she and Balfour are assaulted by a gang of street punks. A horn-masked figure, Faust, then appears, laughing and singing while he slaughters the street punks with a pair of retractable forearm talons. Jade realizes in horror that Faust is John Jaspers.

Jaspers later wonders if he has spilled too much blood, or not enough. He, apparently hallucinating, sees demons everywhere. One night from his Brooklyn Heights mansion, M calls a radio station and requests to play the song "Are You Lonesome Tonight?" repeatedly, saying it should be dedicated "From M to the new kid in town", Faust.  Later, it is shown that M played a role in Jaspers' Bellevue treatment. M's criminal colleagues want him to unleash his secret "Project Assassin", to eliminate Faust, unaware that Faust is M's prized killer. Jaspers then regains his lost memories of being an assassin for M, as well as the rebellion that led to his supposed "death".

Publications
Faust: Love of the Damned (#1—6 published by Northstar Publishing/Productions in 1989—1990, then reprinted by Rebel Studios; #7—15 published by Rebel Studios in 1991—2012; collected in volumes titled Faust: Communion)
Faust/777: The Wrath (aka Darkness in Collision) (#0, 1—4 published by Avatar Press in 1998—1999, crossover with Quinn & Vigil's 777: The Wrath)
Faust: Book of M (#1—3 published by Avatar Press in 1999)
Faust: Singha's Talons (#½, 1—4 published by Avatar Press in 2000)
Faust: Claire's Lust (one-shot published by Avatar Press in 2000)

Anthology appearances
Raw Media Mags #1 (published by Rebel Studios in 1991; includes "2020: Giant Step", a then-futuristic Faust tale)
Threshold #7 (published by Avatar Press in 1998; includes Faust/777: The Wrath prelude)
Threshold #24 (published by Avatar Press ; includes Faust: Singha's Talons prelude)

References

Citations

Sources

 

 

 

 

 

 

 

 

 

 

 

 

 

 

 

 

 

 

Fictional demons and devils
Fictional mass murderers
Fictional artists
Fictional assassins in comics
Avatar Press titles
American comics adapted into films
Comics characters introduced in 1987
Vigilante characters in comics